Standings and results for Group G of the Top 16 phase of the 2011–12 Turkish Airlines Euroleague basketball tournament.

Standings

Fixtures/results

Game 1

Game 2

Game 3

Game 4

Game 5

Game 6

External links
Standings

Group G